Yaw Amankwah Mireku (born 25 November 1979) is a Ghanaian former professional footballer who played as a centre-back. He was part of the 64 battalion team of Hearts of Oak the won the 2000 CAF Champions League and 2004 CAF Confederation Cup.

Club career
Born in Accra, Amankwah began his career with Hearts of Oak and was the team captain. After ten years with Hearts of Oak he left to sign with I-League team Viva Kerala on 12 June 2007. In January 2008 he signed a contract with Poly Tank Division One League side Pure Joy Stars. Mireku left Pure Joy Stars after eleven months and signed with Ghana Premier League club All Stars F.C. in December 2008.

International career
Mireku played for the Black Stars 16 games from 2001 to 2005. He played his first game for the Black Stars on 11 March 2001 against Nigeria national football team.

Honours

Club 
Hearts of Oak

 Ghana Premier League: 1997–98, 1999, 2000, 2001, 2002, 2004,2006–07
 Ghanaian FA Cup: 1999, 2000
Ghana Super Cup: 1997, 1998

Notes and references

External links
 

Living people
1979 births
Footballers from Accra
Association football defenders
Ghanaian footballers
Legon Cities FC players
Accra Hearts of Oak S.C. players
Ghana international footballers
2002 African Cup of Nations players
Ghanaian expatriate footballers
Ghanaian expatriate sportspeople in India
Expatriate footballers in India